Wade is an Indian 2D animated short film written and directed by Upamanyu Bhattacharyya and Kalp Sanghvi. It follows a group of climate change refugees in Kolkata, India, as they are attacked by an ambush of Royal Bengal Tigers. It imagines futures around sea level rise, global warming, ecological disruption and mass migration.

The film was made in Kolkata by Ghost Animation and premiered at the Annecy International Animation Festival 2020, where it won the City of Annecy Award.

Premise 

Kolkata, India, in the near future, has been badly affected by climate change and sea level rise. The floodwater has forced most people to move out of the city, turning it into a ghost town. The Sundarbans forest, just to the city's southern fringe, has also been devastated, forcing a lot of wildlife, including tigers, to move north into the shell of Kolkata.

However, a few people remain in the city, wading around, looking for sustenance. A family of climate change refugees arrive in a flooded Park Street, where they are attacked by a hungry tiger. While some are killed, the rest manage to flee into a building nearby, leaving behind a blind girl who uses a raft made of plastic bottles for her conveyance.

When a much larger ambush of tigers arrives on the scene, things begin to take a dark turn when both species go to extraordinary lengths to survive.

Production

Writing 
Writing began in April, 2016, in Mumbai. The film subsequently took inspiration from writings such as The Great Derangement by Amitav Ghosh and The Uninhabitable Earth by David Wallace-Wells. For reference for the background art, the crew took photographs in Park Street, Kumartuli, and Shovabazar in Kolkata. The crew made research trips to Alipore Zoo to study the movements of Royal Bengal Tigers.

Crowdfunding 
In September 2016, the film ran a successful crowdfunding campaign on the Indian crowdfunding platform, Wishberry.

Animation 
The film was animated on Adobe Photoshop, TVPaint and Krita. Production largely took place in the Ghost Animation studio in Kolkata, and the directors worked with a team of 30 artists. The film was made in a 4:3 aspect ratio to make the human-tiger standoff situations feel more 'claustrophobic'. The film was composited on Adobe AfterEffects. The sound design was executed on Ableton, and audio recordings took place in a river Vashind, Maharashtra, to add authenticity to the nature sounds and splashes.

Festival screenings 
'Wade' has played in numerous festivals globally, and also went on a domestic tour in India, playing in 23 venues across 8 cities.

References

External links 

 Annecy Announces Special Prize, MIFA Pitch Prize Winners
 The Asian Short Films of the 2020  Annecy Festival Under the Microscope
 Poland’s ‘Marygoround’ wins big at Fantasia
 In the acclaimed 'Wade', climate change returns Kolkata to the swamps it was reclaimed from
Our Top Animated Short Picks from Encounters Film Festival

Climate change films
Indian animated short films
Indian animated films
Films set in Kolkata